Stuart A. Wright is an American Professor of Sociology and Chair of the Department of Sociology, Social Work and Criminal Justice at Lamar University in Beaumont, Texas who has served as a legal expert in several high profile trials in the United States.

Bibliography
 Armageddon in Waco: Critical Perspectives on the Branch Davidian Conflict, University Of Chicago Press (September 20, 1995), .
 The Demise of Religion: How Religions End, Die or Dissipate , Bloomsbury Academic Publishers (December 2020), .
 Patriots, Politics, and the Oklahoma City Bombing (Cambridge Studies in Contentious Politics), Cambridge University Press (June 30, 2007), .
 Saints under Siege: The Texas State Raid on the Fundamentalist Latter Day Saints (with James T. Richardson) (August 2011), New York University Press, .
 Storming Zion: Government Raids on Religious Communities (with Susan J. Palmer) (2016) Oxford University Press, .

References

American sociologists
Living people
Researchers of new religious movements and cults
Lamar University people
American male writers
Year of birth missing (living people)